Spangbergiella viridis is a species of leafhopper in the family Cicadellidae.

References

 Dmitriev D (2009). "Nymphs of some Nearctic leafhoppers (Homoptera, Cicadellidae) with description of a new tribe". ZooKeys 29: 13-33.

Further reading

 

Insects described in 1872
Hecalini